Shmuel ha-Katan (literally Samuel the Small, or Samuel the Lesser) was a Babylonian Jew considered a great early religious scholar. He was one of the second generation of Tannaim, who served under the patriarch Gamliel II of Yavneh, during the last two decades of the 1st century CE.

He is supposed to have established some of the standard prayers of the Jewish liturgy, the Siddur. Particularly, he wrote the Birkat HaMinim benediction, the 19th blessing in the silent prayer said three times daily, the Amidah. This prayer condemns heretics, most likely the Jewish Christians.

External links
Jeffrey M. Cohen, "Shmuel HaKatan and the political background to Avot 4:19" originally in Judaism,  Spring, 1995

Mishnah rabbis
1st-century rabbis